Peterborough is a unitary authority in Cambridgeshire, England. Until 1 April 1998 it was a non-metropolitan district.

Political control
Since the first election to the council in 1973 political control of the council has been held by the following parties:

Non-metropolitan district

Unitary authority

Leadership
The leaders of the council since 2003 have been:

Council elections

Non-metropolitan district elections
1973 Peterborough City Council election
1976 Peterborough City Council election (New ward boundaries)
1978 Peterborough City Council election
1979 Peterborough City Council election
1980 Peterborough City Council election
1982 Peterborough City Council election
1983 Peterborough City Council election
1984 Peterborough City Council election
1986 Peterborough City Council election
1987 Peterborough City Council election
1988 Peterborough City Council election
1990 Peterborough City Council election (City boundary changes took place but the number of seats remained the same)
1991 Peterborough City Council election
1992 Peterborough City Council election
1994 Peterborough City Council election
1995 Peterborough City Council election
1996 Peterborough City Council election

Unitary authority elections
1997 Peterborough City Council election (New ward boundaries)
1999 Peterborough City Council election
2000 Peterborough City Council election
2001 Peterborough City Council election
2002 Peterborough City Council election
2004 Peterborough City Council election (New ward boundaries)
2006 Peterborough City Council election
2007 Peterborough City Council election (Some new ward boundaries)
2008 Peterborough City Council election
2010 Peterborough City Council election
2011 Peterborough City Council election
2012 Peterborough City Council election
2014 Peterborough City Council election
2015 Peterborough City Council election
2016 Peterborough City Council election (New ward boundaries)
2018 Peterborough City Council election
2019 Peterborough City Council election
2021 Peterborough City Council election

City result maps

By-election results

By-election results

References

External links

 
Politics of Peterborough
Council elections in Cambridgeshire
Unitary authority elections in England